The 10th Canadian Screen Awards were held on April 10, 2022, to honour achievements in Canadian film, television and digital media production in 2021. Nominations were announced on February 15.

Due to the ongoing COVID-19 pandemic in Canada, the main presentation of top award categories on April 10 were again staged as a pre-taped virtual special rather than at a live theatrical gala; however, unlike the 2020 and 2021 presentations, which were streamed solely on the Academy's social media accounts, the 2022 presentation was broadcast on CBC Television and CBC Gem. Awards in the categories not highlighted on the April 10 broadcast were presented in a series of Canadian Screen Week livestreams over the week before the main ceremony: broadcast news and documentary and factual awards on April 4; sports programming and digital categories on April 5; children's, animation, lifestyle and reality on April 6; television craft and performance on April 7; and cinematic arts on April 8.

In film, the top nominees were Scarborough and Night Raiders, with 11 nods apiece, while in television the series Sort Of was the leader with 13 nominations.

Reviewing the film nominations, Barry Hertz of The Globe and Mail characterized them as "the perfect slate", on the grounds that they had struck an excellent balance between the traditional tensions around whether an award nomination slate should celebrate films that are already relatively well-known or highlight underrated work that merits further attention.

Hosts and presenters
The April 10 broadcast was hosted by the sketch comedy troupe TallBoyz. Category presenters included Catherine O'Hara, Tatiana Maslany, Sidney Crosby, Ron MacLean, Jonathan and Drew Scott, Arisa Cox, Andrew Phung and Priyanka. Actor Simu Liu also appeared in sketches with TallBoyz.

The advance Canadian Screen Week presentations were hosted by Brandon Gonez, Sangita Patel, Jennifer Hedger, Supinder Wraich, Deepa Prashad, Mary Berg, Akiel Julien, Ennis Esmer and Laurence Leboeuf.

Special awards
Recipients of the Academy's special awards were announced on January 18.

Board of Directors Tribute Award: Vince Commisso, John Galway 
Gordon Sinclair Award: Rassi Nashalik
Radius Award: Maitreyi Ramakrishnan
Changemaker Award: Kayla Grey, Kathleen Newman-Bremang, Amanda Parris
Lifetime Achievement Award: Bob Cole

Film

Television

Programs

Actors

News and information

Sports

Craft awards

Directing

Music

Writing

All-platform awards
One major category is currently presented without regard to the distinction between film, television or web media content.

Audience awards
Nominees for the fan-voted Audience Choice award were announced on February 1. Although normally individual actors or personalities are nominated in the category, in 2022 the Academy chose to honour shows.

The audience choice award was actually won by a show that had not been officially listed as one of the ten nominees; the process for this category does permit "write-in" campaigns.

Digital media

References

External links
Canadian Screen Awards

10
2021 film awards
2021 television awards
2022 in Ontario
2021 awards in Canada